Vasily Pavlovich Mikhalyov (20 March 1917 — 10 December 2006) was a Soviet fighter pilot during World War II. Awarded the title Hero of the Soviet Union on 1 July 1944 for his initial victories, he totaled over 20 solo aerial victories including an aerial ramming during the war, although the exact tally is subject to some dispute.

References 

1917 births
2006 deaths
Soviet World War II flying aces
Heroes of the Soviet Union
Recipients of the Order of Lenin
Recipients of the Order of the Red Banner
Recipients of the Order of Alexander Nevsky
Recipients of the Order of the Red Star
Pilots who performed an aerial ramming